The 2022 National Counties Championship is the 117th National Counties Cricket Championship season. It is contested in two divisions. Oxfordshire were the defending champions, but this season they finished second in the Western Division 1. The title was won by Berkshire by defeating Lincolnshire in the final by an innings and 69 runs. The final was played in West Bromwich, Staffordshire. This was the overall 9th title for Berkshire and their 5th in the last 7 years.

Standings

Format
Teams receive 16 points for a win, 8 for a tie and 4 for a draw. In a match reduced to a single innings, teams receive 12 points for a win, 8 for a draw (6 if less than 20 overs per side) and 4 points for losing. For matches abandoned without play, both sides receive 8 points. Bonus points (a maximum of 4 batting points and 4 bowling points) may be scored during the first 90 overs of each team's first innings.

Eastern Division
 Division 1

Lincolnshire were Eastern Division Champions.
Lincolnshire qualified for the NCCA Championship Final.
Bedfordshire were relegated to Division Two.

 Division 2

Buckinghamshire were Eastern Division Two Champions.
Buckinghamshire were promoted to Division One.

Western Division
 Division 1

Berkshire were Western Division Champions.
Berkshire qualified for the NCCA Championship Final.
Dorset were relegated to Division Two.

 Division 2

Devon were Western Division Two Champions.
Devon were promoted to Division One.

Final
The final featured the teams which finished with the most points in each Division One, Lincolnshire and Berkshire. It began on 4 September 2022 at Sandwell Park with the result being a victory for Berkshire by an innings and 69 runs. Berkshire won their ninth title, with the five being won in the last seven years, whilst Lincolnshire's most recent victory was in 2003.

References

2022 in English cricket
2022